Jessica Abel (born 1969) is an American comic book writer and artist, known as the creator of such works as Life Sucks, Drawing Words & Writing Pictures, Soundtrack, La Perdida, Mirror, Window, Radio: An Illustrated Guide (with collaborator Ira Glass), and the omnibus series Artbabe.

Early life
Abel was born in 1969 in Chicago, Illinois, and raised in the Chicago metropolitan area. She graduated from Evanston Township High School. She attended Carleton College for in 1987–88, and then transferred to the University of Chicago, where she published her first comics work in 1988, in the student anthology Breakdown. She also held administrative positions including Assistant to the Associate Dean and graduate and undergraduate chairs at SAIC. She graduated with a BA degree.

Career

Abel began her comics career through minicomics, self-publishing the photocopied, hand-sewn and embellished comic book Artbabe in 1992; four annual issues followed, with Abel having won a Xeric Foundation grant to self-publish and distribute issue #5. This was the first professionally printed Artbabe, and was subtitled The Four Seasons. She appeared as a character in the back-cover story of  Hate #10 (Fall 1992) by Peter Bagge. Abel has stated that her major work Artbabe is not autobiographical.

With the publication of the Xeric issue of Artbabe, Abel came to the attention of Fantagraphics publisher Gary Groth, who offered to publish Artbabe. Each issue of Artbabe contained one or more complete stories; Abel did not begin any longer sequential work until La Perdida in 2000. The character Artbabe, who appears on every cover, does not actually appear in any of the stories.

In 1998, Abel moved to Mexico City with her boyfriend, now husband, comics artist Matt Madden. She went on hiatus from Artbabe in 1999. 

From 1996–2005, Abel did a series of one-page journalistic comics for the University of Chicago Magazine. In 1997 she self-published Jessica Abel, Intrepid Girl Reporter, a 20-page minicomic collecting her various journalistic comic strips from that and other publications. (A lot of material from the mini was later reprinted in Abel's collections, Soundtrack and Mirror, Window.) For LA Weekly in 2000 and 2001, she did a number of comics journalism pieces on such topics as the 2000 Democratic National Convention and evacuating from Lower Manhattan after the September 11 attacks. During this period she embarked on Radio: an Illustrated Guide for the radio program This American Life. This book depicted how an episode of the show is made, with behind-the-scenes reportage and a how-to guide to creating a radio show at home.

After two years in Mexico City, Abel moved to Brooklyn, New York. Abel created the five-issue, 250-page series La Perdida. Published by Fantagraphics Books between 2000 and 2005 as a five-part mini-series. Abel revised the text for its compilation and publication in 2006 as a hardcover volume by Pantheon Books. The book has received a positive critical response. The central character is a Mexican-American woman, Carla, raised by her Anglo mother, who moves on a whim to Mexico City to search for her identity.

Abel taught undergraduate cartooning courses at the School of Visual Arts for a number of years, and gave workshops at other locations, such as Ox-Bow Summer School of Art.

In 2008, Abel and Madden produced Drawing Words and Writing Pictures for First Second Books. The book was a product of the years Abel and Madden spent as teachers, and is a comprehensive manual on creating comics. That same year, Abel also collaborated on Life Sucks, written with Gabe Soria and Warren Pleece.

Abel and Madden produced a second comics teaching textbook together called Mastering Comics, a sequel to Drawing Words and Writing Pictures, published in May 2012. Abel and Madden then both moved to France for a one-year artists’ residency at La Maison des Auteurs in Angoulême in 2012, that became an extended four-year stay.

In 2015, Abel published a sequel to her 1999 comic Radio: An Illustrated Guide called "Out On The Wire: The Storytelling Secrets of the New Masters of Radio".

On June 7, 2016 Abel announced that she was returning to the United States to accept a position as chair of the brand-new illustration department at PAFA, the Pennsylvania Academy of the Fine Arts.

Exhibitions
Abel's one-person exhibitions include "Corridoio Altervox" in Rome, the Phoenix Gallery in Brighton; the Oporto International Comics Festival in Portugal, Viñetas desde o Atlántico in A Coruna, Spain, and the Naples Comicon.

Her group exhibitions include the Jean Albano Gallery in Chicago, Athaneum, Stripdagen, in the Netherlands, the Davidson Galleries in Seattle, the Forbes Gallery at the Hyde Park Art Center, in New York, the Regina Miller Gallery and Vox Gallery in Philadelphia, Centre National de la Bande Dessinée et de l'Image in Angoulême, France, and the Norman Rockwell Museum in Stockbridge, Massachusetts.

Awards and honors
 Harvey Award
 Chicago Artists International Program Grant
 Xeric Grant

Bibliography
 Abel, with Ira Glass, Radio: An Illustrated Guide, (WBEZ Alliance, 1999) 
 Soundtrack: Short Stories 1989–1996 (Fantagraphics Books, 2001) 
 Mirror, Window: An Artbabe Collection (Fantagraphics Books, 2000) ; compilation of Artbabe Vol. 2, nos. 1–4 (1997–1999)
 La Perdida (Pantheon Books, 2006) ; a revised compilation of La Perdida nos. 1–5 (2001–2005, Fantagraphics Books)
 Illustrations by Abel, edited by Carrie Russell, Complete Copyright: An Everyday Guide for Librarians (American Library Association, 2004) 
 Life Sucks (with Gabriel Soria and Warren Pleece, First Second, 2008) 
 Abel, with Matt Madden, Drawing Words and Writing Pictures, (First Second, 2008)

See also 
List of women comics writers and artists
List of American comics creators

References

Further reading

External links 

 
 

1969 births
Alternative cartoonists
American female comics artists
Female comics writers
Feminist artists
Living people
Artists from Chicago
School of Visual Arts faculty
Harvey Award winners for Best New Talent
American women cartoonists
Evanston Township High School alumni
20th-century American women writers
Writers from Chicago
21st-century American women writers
20th-century American women artists
American cartoonists